Tiftarea Academy (TA) is a PK–12 co-educational private school in Chula, Georgia, United States.

History 
Tiftarea Academy was founded in response to the federally mandated racial desegregation of public schools. According to Mike Bowler of the Atlanta Journal-Constitution, in 1970, the school could be described as a segregation academy.

In 1972, the school did not enroll any black students. As of 2019, the academy's enrollment of 676 students included 2.4% Asians, 0.5% African Americans and 0.5% Hispanic students.

References

External links 
 

Schools in Tift County, Georgia
Private elementary schools in Georgia (U.S. state)
Private middle schools in Georgia (U.S. state)
Private high schools in Georgia (U.S. state)
Segregation academies in Georgia